Wadsworth is a masculine given name which may refer to:

 Wadsworth Busk (1730–1811), Attorney-General of the Isle of Man
 Wadsworth Harris (1864-1942), American silent film actor
 Wadsworth Jarrell (born 1929), African-American painter, sculptor and printmaker
 Wadsworth A. Parker (1864-1938), American printer and typeface designer

English masculine given names